Glas is a Lowland Scottish, Dutch or Low German metonymic surname meaning "glass". It is also an Irish and Highland Scottish surname meaning "green". Notable people with the surname include:

Arend Glas (born 1968), Dutch bobsledder
Erich Glas (1897–1973), German-Israeli artist
George Glas (1725–1765), Scottish mariner
Gerrit Glas (born 1954), Dutch professor
Gotthard Glas, birth name of Uziel Gal (1923–2002), German-born Israeli gun-designer
Hanna Glas (born 1992), Swedish footballer
Hans Glas (1890–1969), German entrepreneur who built cars with the brand Glas, which was bought by BMW.
Imke Glas (born 1994), Dutch artistic gymnast
John Glas (1695–1773), Scottish clergyman
Jorge Glas (born 1969), Ecuadorian Vice President
Jürgen Glas (born 1956), German swimmer
Konrad Glas (born 1940), German sailor
Rich Glas, American basketball coach
Stéphane Glas (born 1973), French rugby player
Tyko Gabriel Glas, fictional character in the Swedish novel Doctor Glas (1905)
Uschi Glas (born 1944), German film and television actress

See also 
Glasite, Scottish denomination founded by John Glas
John S. Glas Field House, American hockey arena renamed in honour of John S. Glas
George Glas Sandeman Carey (1867–1948), British army officer
Seaán Glas mac Tadhg Riabhach Ó Dubhda (died c. 1471), Irish Chief of the Name and Lord of Tireragh
An Giolla Glas Ó Caiside (fl. 1515–27), Gaelic-Irish physician and scribe
Eochaid Faebar Glas, legendary High King of Ireland

Dutch-language surnames
German-language surnames